Penny Lake may refer to:

Penny Lake (Antarctica)
Penny Lake (Blaine County, Idaho)
Penny Lake (Portage County, Wisconsin)